December Ngobeni (born 18 December 1975) is a South African former soccer player.

References

1975 births
South African soccer players
Living people
Association football midfielders
Platinum Stars F.C. players
Hanover Park F.C. players